Irina (Cyrillic: Ирина) is a feminine given name of Ancient Greek origin, commonly borne by followers of the Eastern Orthodox Church. It is derived from Eirene (Ancient Greek: Εἰρήνη), an ancient Greek goddess, personification of peace. It is mostly used in countries within the Commonwealth of Independent States and the Balkans.

Diminutive forms in Slavic languages include Ira, Irinka, Irinushka, Irisha, Irka, Irochka, Irinochka.

Origin 
Irina is connected with Irene of Macedonia who was the first woman recognized by the church as a great martyr. She was born pagan as Penelope and later baptized as Irene. Some sources refer to her being baptized by Saint Timothy, in which case she lived in the 1st–2nd century, while others date her death in the year 315. Opinions also differ about the location of her birthplace, the city of Magedon, placing it either in Persia or in Migdonia (Macedonia).

Notable people with this name

Nobility and politics 

 Princess Irina Alexandrovna of Russia (1895–1970)
Irina Khakamada (b. 1955), Russian politician
Irina von Wiese (b. 1967), British politician
 Irina Walker, daughter of King Michael I of Romania
Irina Yusupova, Russian princess

Arts and music 

 Irina Allegrova, Russian singer
 Irina Antonenko, Miss Russia 2010
 Irina Arkhipova, Soviet and Russian opera singer
 Irina Ionesco, French photographer
 Irina Iordachescu, Romanian soprano opera singer
 Irina Rimes, Moldavian-Romanian singer and songwriter
 Irina Saari, Finnish pop singer, better known by her mononym Irina
 Irina Toneva, Russian pop singer
 Irina Zahharenkova, Estonian and Finnish concert pianist.

Actresses and models 
 Irina Dvorovenko, Ukrainian-American ballet dancer and actress
 Irina Hudova, Finnish ballet dancer and teacher
 Irina Pantaeva, Siberian fashion model and actress
 Irina Shayk, model originally from Russia
 Irina Voronina, Playboy Playmate originally from Russia
 Irina Lazareanu, Romanian-born Canadian model

Sports 

Irina Alexeeva, Russian gymnast
Irina Baskakova, Soviet track and field sprinter
Irina-Camelia Begu, Romanian tennis player
Irina Bespalova, Russian butterfly swimmer
Irina Deleanu, Romanian former individual rhythmic gymnast
Irina Kostyuchenkova, Ukrainian javelin thrower
Irina Krush, chess player
Irina Lashko, Russian-born Australian diver
Irina Loghin, Romanian folk singer
Irina Mikitenko, Kazakhstan-born German long-distance runner, former winner of both the Berlin and London marathons
Irina Podyalovskaya, Soviet middle distance runner
Irina Ponarovskaya, Soviet and Russian singer
Irina Press, Soviet 2x Olympic champion (80-m hurdles & pentathlon)
Irina Rodnina, Soviet figure skater
Irina Sazonova, Russian-Icelandic gymnast
Irina Serova (born 1966), Austrian-Soviet badminton player
Irina Slutskaya, Russian world champion figure skater
Irina Tebenikhina, Russian volleyball player
Irina Ufimtseva, Russian freestyle swimmer

Other
 Irina Gaidamachuk (born 1972), prolific Russian serial killer
 Irina Nikolaevna Levchenko (1924–1973), Russian tank commander
 Irina Livezeanu (born 1952), Romanian-born American historian
 Iryna Senyk (1926–2009), Ukrainian poet, nurse, and Soviet political dissident
 Irina Tsvila (1969–2022), Ukrainian teacher, public activist, and photographer

Fictional characters 
Irina, the child protagonist in Magdalen Nabb's The Enchanted Horse.
Irina Asanova, the great love of fictional Moscow homicide investigator Arkady Renko in the novels Gorky Park and Red Square by Martin Cruz Smith
Irina Derevko, KGB and Covenant terrorist, a main character in the Alias series
Irina Palm, pseudonym of the main character in 2007 film of the same name
Irina Spalko, a fictional Russian mobster in the film Indiana Jones and the Kingdom of the Crystal Skull
Irina Clayton, a.k.a. Choir, a former member of the Xavier Institute student body and the Street Team X-Men in the Marvel Comics Universe
Irina Nikolaievna Spaskaya, former KGB agent and expert pole vaulter from St.Petersburg in the 39 Clues Series
Irina, One of the three sisters in Anton Chekhov's play Three Sisters
Irina Kerchenkov, a Russian model in Sarra Manning's Fashionistas book series
Irina Denali, a member of the Denali coven in the Twilight series by Stephenie Meyer
Irina, a character from the novel series The Heroic Legend of Arslan by Yoshiki Tanaka.
Irina Shidō, a fictional character from the Japanese light novel series High School DxD by Ichiei Ishibumi.
The Groovy Girls doll line, by Manhattan Toy, features a doll named Irina.
Irina Jelavić, a fictional character in the Japanese manga and anime Assassination Classroom
Irina Clockworker, an antagonist from a series of Vocaloid songs known as "The Evillious Chronicles"
Irina of House Griffin, a playable character in PC game Might and Magic: Heroes VI
Irina Luminesk, the protagonist of Irina: The Vampire Cosmonaut

See also 
 Irina (disambiguation)
 Saint Irene (disambiguation)

References 

Russian feminine given names
Slavic feminine given names
Greek feminine given names
Ukrainian feminine given names
Bulgarian feminine given names
Serbian feminine given names
Croatian feminine given names
Macedonian feminine given names
Czech feminine given names
Hungarian feminine given names
Latvian feminine given names
Lithuanian feminine given names
Albanian feminine given names
Armenian feminine given names
Georgian feminine given names
Romanian feminine given names
Circassian feminine given names
Finnish feminine given names